Ćuprija (Serbian Cyrillic: Ћуприја) is a town and municipality located in the Pomoravlje District of central Serbia. The population of the town is 19,380, while the municipality has 30,645 inhabitants.

History 
The Romans founded the town as a fort Horreum Margi (Horreum: Granary, Margi: Morava) on the road from Constantinople to Rome, where it crosses the river now known as Velika Morava. It served as a Roman military base, had a shield factory and gained the status of municipium before AD 224. In 505, the Romans were defeated by Goths and Huns under Mundo, a descendant of Attila the Hun.

Under Slavic rule, it became known as Ravno (literal translation to English would be "flat"), since it is in a flat river valley. Some local names (of the villages Paljane and Isakovo, of the river Mirosava) recall the major clash in autumn 1191 between the Serbs (under Stefan Nemanja) and the Byzantines (under Emperor Isaac II Angelos).

In the 15th century, Ćuprija became part of Ottoman Empire. After conquering this settlement, the Turks built a bridge or "köprü" in Turkish – hence the name of the town. Shortly after the First Serbian Uprising began, in 1805 one of the first and most important battles was won by Ivankovac, near Ćuprija. Serbian uprisers under the leadership of dukes Milenko Stojković, Petar Dobrnjac, and Stevan Sinđelić defeated a Turkish army which led to further spreading of the Uprising through all of Belgrade Pashaluk. Four years after that, in 1809, Ćuprija Elementary school was founded.

During the Second Serbian Uprising, Serbian prince Miloš Obrenović made an oral agreement in Ćuprija which enabled Serbs in Belgrade Pashaluk to collect their own taxes, to participate in proceedings against Serbs and to establish a National Office composed of Serbian princes. After 1834, the town started to grow economically and eventually merged with the nearby villages of Mućava, Mrčajevci, and Žirovnica. In the Ottoman era, Ćuprija was the town of Smederevo with the highest concentration of Albanians. Contemporary Serb author Joakim Vujić recorded more "Turkish Arnauts than Serbs" in 1826 in the town. After the war, Obrenović began a campaign to buy out all Muslim Albanian households in the town. In 1853, "Dobričevo" farm was founded. This led to the establishment of the Agricultural school in 1899. In 1911, a Sugar factory called "ŠELK 911" was founded.

During the 19th century, Ćuprija was the center of Nahiyah. After 1890, it was the seat of Morvaski okrug (Morava County).

From 1929 to 1941, Ćuprija was part of the Morava Banovina of the Kingdom of Yugoslavia.

In World War Two, a special Ćuprija-Paraćin partisan troop was formed in order to fight against the German Wehrmacht. On September 26, 1941, 35 members of this troop were shot by German occupiers. The Second World War finally ended in Ćuprija on October 13, 1944, when town was liberated from the Wehrmacht during the so-called Belgrade Operation.

During the NATO bombing of Yugoslavia in 1999, the town's center was heavily damaged. Some buildings still remain in ruins. As of 2011 census, the municipality has 30,645 inhabitants.

Settlements 
Aside from the town of Ćuprija, the municipality includes the following 16 settlements:

 Batinac
 Bigrenica
 Dobričevo
 Dvorica
 Isakovo
 Ivankovac
 Jovac
 Kovanica
 Krušar
 Mijatovac
 Ostrikovac
 Paljane
 Senje
 Supska
 Virine
 Vlaška

Demographics 

The municipality of Ćuprija has a population of 30,645 inhabitants, according to the 2011 census results. All settlements in municipality have Serb ethnic majority except two villages, Bigrenica and Isakovo with Vlach ethnic majority.

Economy 
The following table gives a preview of total number of registered people employed in legal entities per their core activity (as of 2018):

Society and culture

Education 
Elementary school "Đura Jakšić"
Elementary school "Vuk Stefanović Karadžić"
Elementary school "13. Oktobar"
High school in Ćuprija
Medical High-School
Technical School
Medical College in Ćuprija
Musical Elementary School "Dušan Skovran"
School for musically gifted children
Faculty for banking and trade, Alpha University
College of Health Studies

Sports 
Sport activities in Ćuprija are developed. Thanks to many athletes and coaches (such as Vera Nikolić, Dragan Zdravković, Snežana Jolović-Pajkić, Zora Antić -Tomecić, Miroslav Pavlović, Vladan Đorđević, Dušan Košutić, Vlada Jovanović, Ljiljana Šušnjar and Aleksandar Petrović etc.) Ćuprija was well known as "the Athletics town". Beside athletic, soccer (football in Europe), basketball, handball, tennis and volleyball are extremely popular sports in Ćuprija.

Ćuprija's football club "Morava" was founded in 1918 and is currently competing in Pomoravsko-Timočka football zone. It has its own stadium with a capacity of 10,000 sport fans.
In Ćuprija, there could be found a dance club for those who love to dance.

Features 
The main source of income is the College of Nursing and Agriculture.

Climate 
Ćuprija has a humid subtropical climate (Cfa) with hot summers coupled with cool nights and moderately cold, snowy, and very cloudy winters. Precipitation peaks during the month of June.

International relations

Twin towns — Sister cities 
Ćuprija is twinned with:
 Celje, Slovenia
 Doboj, Bosnia and Herzegovina
 Gradiška, Bosnia and Herzegovina, since 1994

Notable people 
 Dušan Matić, poet
 Dragoslav Mihailović, writer
 Filip Stojković, professional footballer
 Snežana Pajkić, middle-distance runner
 Vera Nikolić, athlete and coach

See also 
 List of places in Serbia

References

Sources

External links 

 

Populated places in Pomoravlje District
Municipalities and cities of Šumadija and Western Serbia